Ocean Bank Convocation Center (formerly known as Sunblazer Arena, Golden Panther Arena, Pharmed Arena, U.S. Century Bank Arena, and FIU Arena) is a 5,000-seat multi-purpose arena at Florida International University in Westchester, Florida. It was opened on February 1, 1986, and is home to the FIU Panthers basketball and volleyball teams. It was originally named Sunblazer Arena, but was renamed Golden Panther Arena when FIU's athletic teams changed their nickname from Sunblazers to Golden Panthers in 1987. It was renamed Pharmed Arena in 2004, and then was briefly named FIU Arena in 2008 before being renamed to U.S. Century Bank Arena. The facility reverted to the FIU Arena name again from 2014 to 2018 before being renamed the Ocean Bank Convocation Center in 2018.

The  arena contains a  wooden arena floor. It is also used for banquets, conventions, concerts, trade shows, and graduations including FIU's own commencement ceremonies.

Four retractable basketball backboards allow for the floor to be divided into two practice courts, while Hydra Goal II portable basketball standards are used for intercollegiate competition. Nevco scoreboards are found at either end.

Support areas include an equipment room, athletic training room, 876 lockers in six different,  offices and boardrooms for FIU athletic administrators, and full-service dressing rooms. Academic space in the building includes three classrooms, as well as physiology and kinesiology laboratories. 

In late 2008, U.S. Century Bank bought naming rights to the arena, changing the arena's name to U.S. Century Bank Arena. The arena was scheduled to undergo a $5 million renovation beginning in the summer or fall of 2010, with a completion date of early 2011.

In January 2015, the Ocean Bank Convocation Center hosted the Miss Universe 2014 pageant.

On January 26, 2019, the arena broke its attendance record for a basketball game with 4,710 spectators for a game between FIU and their local rivals Florida Atlantic.

See also
FIU Panthers
Riccardo Silva Stadium (FIU Football)
Infinity Insurance Park (FIU Baseball)
List of NCAA Division I basketball arenas

References

External links
U.S. Century Bank Arena

College basketball venues in the United States
College volleyball venues in the United States
U.S. Century Bank Arena
Basketball venues in Florida
1986 establishments in Florida
Sports venues completed in 1986